Robert Bithway (by 1517 – 1557) was a tanner and the member of the Parliament of England for Marlborough for the parliament of October 1553.

He was mayor of Marlborough in 1555–56.

References 

Members of Parliament for Marlborough
English MPs 1553 (Mary I)
1510s births
1557 deaths
Mayors of Marlborough
Tanners